La Moda is the third studio album by Yaga & Mackie.

Track listing
Disc 1
"Intro" (Nesty) - 2:00  
"El Tren" (Nesty) - 3:03  
"Vampira" (DJ Blass) - 3:47  
"Fuego" (ft. Tego Calderón) (Yai & Toly) - 3:43  
"Hot Caliente" (Nesty & Víctor) - 2:21  
"Muévete" (ft. Pitbull) (Yai & Toly, DJ Blass) - 3:00
"Uye" (Nesty & Víctor) - 2:55
"Vestido Blanco" (ft. Don Omar) (Yai & Toly) - 3:48
"Let Me Know" (DJ Blass) - 3:33
"Bailando" (ft. Nina Sky) (Yai & Toly) - 3:10
"Cuando Tú Me Miras" (Nesty) - 2:37  
"Imposible Ignorarte" (ft. Zion & Lennox) (Nesty) - 3:33  
"A Ti No" (Tainy) - 3:32  
"Acércate" (ft. Odyssey) (Yai & Toly) - 3:01  
"Skit" (ft. Triunvirato) (Luny Tunes) - 1:25  
"Con Swing" (DJ Blass, Yai & Toly) - 2:35  
"Nena Chula" (ft. Benzino) (Echo & Bones) - 4:05

Yaga & Mackie albums
2005 albums
Albums produced by Luny Tunes